Sun Air Express was a United States airline with its headquarters in Dania Beach, Florida in Greater Miami (the headquarters had a Fort Lauderdale mailing address). It operates charter services as well as scheduled passenger services subsidized under the federal Essential Air Service (EAS) program.

The airline ended subsidized scheduled service to Victoria Regional Airport from George Bush Intercontinental Airport in Houston, Texas on October 31, 2014 after its two-year EAS contract expired. A little over a month later Sun Air began service from Washington Dulles International Airport to Lancaster Airport (Pennsylvania) and Hagerstown Regional Airport in Maryland.

Sun Air had planned to begin service between Atlanta and Middle Georgia Regional Airport in Macon, Georgia on December 1, 2012. However, the airline decided to pull out of the airport deal.

Sun Air Express had a focus city at Pittsburgh International Airport and provided frequent daily service to Altoona, Hagerstown (Maryland), Jamestown (New York), Lancaster, Bradford and Franklin/Oil City.

Upon beginning scheduled service, Sun Air Express' passenger bookings were handled by Pacific Wings and their flight listings in travel reservation systems were under Pacific Wings' IATA code, LW. On April 21, 2015, Sun Air Express flights began being handled by and listed under the code of Mokulele Airlines, (6G).

As of November 2013, Sun Air International received $6,583,848 in annual Federal subsidies for Essential Air Services that they provided to Hagerstown, Maryland, Lancaster, Pennsylvania and Victoria, Texas airports in the U.S.

On March 7, 2016, Southern Airways Express bought Sun Air Express for an undisclosed amount. It will continue the routes currently running and will keep the focus cities that were established by Sun Air. The company withdrew from its Jamestown service after losing Essential Air Service funding.

Destinations

Fleet

See also 
 List of defunct airlines of the United States

References

External links

 

Defunct airlines of the United States
Airlines established in 2012
Airlines disestablished in 2016
Airlines based in Florida
Companies based in Broward County, Florida
Defunct companies based in Florida